Newark 1953 is a 2CD set by American jazz saxophonist Hank Mobley recorded in September, 1953 but released only in 2012 via Uptown Records label. This collection is billed as his earliest known recordings. However, The Max Roach Quartet featuring Hank Mobley was recorded for the Debut label in April 1953.

Background
The tracks were recorded live at "The Picadilly Club", New Jersey, on Monday, September 28, 1953, by Newark native Ozzie Cadena, who would join Savoy a year later as a producer.

Track listing

Personnel
Hank Mobley – tenor sax
Bennie Green – trombone
Walter Davis Jr. – piano
Jimmy Schenck – bass
Charli Persip – drums

References

2012 live albums
Hank Mobley live albums
Live hard bop albums
Uptown Records (jazz) live albums